This is the discography of English rock musician Peter Frampton.

Discography

Studio albums

Live albums

Compilation albums

Singles

Videography

Video albums

References 

Rock music discographies
Discographies of British artists
Discography